The Pulau Indah Expressway, Federal Route 181, is a countryside highway in Selangor, Malaysia. It connects Pandamaran from Shah Alam Expressway to West Port in Pulau Indah. This 17.7 km (11.0 mi) highway was opened to traffic in 1995, after four years of construction. Pulau Indah Expressway is a four-laned expressway, unlike the wider Shah Alam Expressway which has six lanes. Many cargo trucks travel along the highway daily. There are many accidents area along the highway.

The zeroth kilometre of the Federal Route 181 starts at West Port in Pulau Indah.

Selat Lumut Bridge is the longest straits bridge in Klang Valley.

At most sections, the Federal Route 181 was built under the JKR R5 road standard, allowing speed limits of up to 90 km/h.

List of interchanges

See also
West Port, Malaysia

References

Highways in Malaysia
Expressways and highways in the Klang Valley
Malaysian Federal Roads